Paul Michael Hurley (born July 12, 1946) is an American professional ice hockey player who played 477 games in the World Hockey Association and 1 game in the National Hockey League between 1969 and 1977. He also played for the American national team at the 1968 Winter Olympics.

High school 

At Melrose high school, he was a 3-time Middlesex all-star, 2-time first team all-scholastic, 2-time first team high school all-American, and 2-time award winner as the outstanding defenseman for the New England school boy tournament. Paul was part of the school's undefeated 1962 team that won the Middlesex league, State and New England school boy hockey champions. During 1963 at Melrose High School, Paul tied for the league scoring championship while playing defense. He was first team Middlesex all-star, all-State and New England tournament all-star (for 2 years straight), scoring 26 goals. Paul was inducted into the first Melrose High School sports hall of fame.

Paul went to Deerfield Academy for 1-year post graduate in 1964. He had 31 goals as a defenseman and was recognized as a first team all-prep all-star.

College 
During his freshman year at Boston College, he led the freshman Boston College Eaglets with 22 goals in 18 games as a defenseman. During his junior year, the only year he played forward, Hurley scored 32 goals in 28 games and had 6 hat tricks. During his college career, he was an All-New England, All-East and first team All-American award recipient.  During his senior year, Paul was recognized as the Boston College team MVP and was a first team All-American defenseman. Paul was later inducted into the Boston College sports hall of fame.

International 
While playing hockey at Boston College, Hurley was also a member of the United States men's national ice hockey team for two years, playing in the 1967 Ice Hockey World Championships and the 1968 Winter Olympics.

National Hockey League 

At the end of his senior year of college hockey, Hurley was signed as a free agent by the Boston Bruins. He played his first and only NHL professional hockey game on March 30, 1969. During that game, Hurley and Ron Murphy assisted on Phil Esposito's 48th goal of the season making the Bruins the first team to reach 300 goals in a season; they finished with 303 goals.

World Hockey Association 

Paul started his WHA career with the New England Whalers in 1972-1973 and was part of the team's AVCO Cup champions of the World Hockey Association. In 1975, while with the Whalers, Paul won the team's Unsung Hero Award.

He played for the New England Whalers, Edmonton Oilers and Calgary Cowboys.

Career statistics

Regular season and playoffs

International

Awards and honors

See also
List of players who played only one game in the NHL

References 
 

1946 births
Living people
AHCA Division I men's ice hockey All-Americans
American men's ice hockey defensemen
Calgary Cowboys players
Boston College Eagles men's ice hockey players
Boston Braves (AHL) players
Boston Bruins players
Edmonton Oilers (WHA) players
New England Whalers players
Ice hockey players from Massachusetts
Ice hockey players at the 1968 Winter Olympics
Oklahoma City Blazers (1965–1977) players
Olympic ice hockey players of the United States
Sportspeople from Everett, Massachusetts